Hurley is an unincorporated community and census-designated place (CDP) in Jackson County, Mississippi, United States. It is part of the Pascagoula Metropolitan Statistical Area. The population was 1,551 at the 2010 census, up from 985 at the 2000 census.

Geography
Hurley is located in northeastern Jackson County at  (30.663293, -88.499558). Mississippi Highway 613 passes through the center of town, leading north  to Lucedale and south  to Pascagoula, the Jackson county seat. Mississippi Highway 614 forms the southern edge of Hurley, leading west  to Wade and east  to the Alabama border.

Demographics

2020 census

As of the 2020 United States census, there were 1,557 people, 507 households, and 362 families residing in the CDP.

2000 census
As of the census of 2000, there were 985 people, 331 households, and 278 families residing in the CDP. The population density was 191.2 people per square mile (73.8/km2). There were 348 housing units at an average density of 67.6/sq mi (26.1/km2). The racial makeup of the CDP was 97.36% White, 0.91% African American, 0.51% Asian, and 1.22% from two or more races.

There were 331 households, out of which 43.8% had children under the age of 18 living with them, 69.5% were married couples living together, 11.8% had a female householder with no husband present, and 16.0% were non-families. 13.9% of all households were made up of individuals, and 6.9% had someone living alone who was 65 years of age or older. The average household size was 2.96 and the average family size was 3.27.

In the CDP, the population was spread out, with 29.2% under the age of 18, 8.4% from 18 to 24, 29.2% from 25 to 44, 24.2% from 45 to 64, and 8.9% who were 65 years of age or older. The median age was 35 years. For every 100 females, there were 89.8 males. For every 100 females age 18 and over, there were 89.9 males.

The median income for a household in the CDP was $46,042, and the median income for a family was $50,909. Males had a median income of $51,136 versus $20,326 for females. The per capita income for the CDP was $18,761. About 6.2% of families and 6.9% of the population were below the poverty line, including 7.7% of those under age 18 and 7.9% of those age 65 or over.

Public safety

Fire department

The North East Jackson County Fire Department provides fire protection for the community.

Law enforcement

The Jackson County Sheriff's Office provides law enforcement services for the community.

Education
Hurley is served by the Jackson County School District. It includes two elementary schools, one middle school, and one high school.

Elementary schools
 East Central Lower Elementary School
 East Central Upper Elementary School

Middle school
 East Central Middle School

High school
 East Central High School, the 2017/2018 South State Football Champions

References

External links

Census-designated places in Jackson County, Mississippi
Census-designated places in Mississippi
Pascagoula metropolitan area